The year 2017 was the third year in the history of the Rizin Fighting Federation, a mixed martial arts promotion based in Japan. 2017 started with Rizin Fighting Federation 5 in Yokohama. It started broadcasting through a television agreement with  Fuji Television. In North America and Europe Rizin FF 5 was available on FITE TV.

Background
Nobuyuki Sakakibara announced that Rizin will do 5 events in 2017: April, July, October, and the usual December 29 and 31 show.

He also announced that they will do 2 Grand Prix this year. One is men, other is women. He stated the women grand prix will be at Atomweight due to the fact Rena Kubota will be in the grand prix. Kyoji Horiguchi will compete in the men tournament which take place at Bantamweight 61 kg.

Rizin's Bantamweight grand prix will begin on July 30 at the Saitama Super Arena, with the first four opening rounds bouts of the tournament bracket. The remaining four opening bouts will take place in the autumn. Similar to the last year GP, the quarterfinals are scheduled for Dec. 29. The semifinals and finals will be held on the same night, Dec. 31, at Saitama Super Arena.

16-Man Bantamweight 61 kg GP Participant
  Kyoji Horiguchi
  Hideo Tokoro
  Erson Yamamoto
  Takafumi Otsuka
  Keita Ishibashi
  Khalid Taha
  Anthony Birchak 
  Shintaro Ishiwatari
  Manel Kape
  Akhmed Musakaev
  Jae Hoon Moon  
  Kevin Petshi 
  Ian McCall
  Gabriel Oliviera

8-Female Super Atomweight 49 kg GP Participant
  Rena Kubota
  Kanna Asakura
  Andy Nguyen
  Miyuu Yamamoto
  Maria Oliveira
  Sylwia Juśkiewicz
  Alyssa Garcia
  Irene Cabello Rivera

List of events

Rizin Bantamweight Grand Prix 2017 bracket

Rizin Women's Super Atomweight Grand Prix 2017 bracket

Rizin Flyweight KB Tournament

Rizin 2017 in Yokohama: Sakura

 Rizin 2017 in Yokohama: Sakura  was a mixed martial arts event held by the Rizin Fighting Federation on April 16, 2017 at the Yokohama Arena in Yokohama, Japan.

Results

Rizin World Grand Prix 2017: Opening Round - Part 1

Rizin World Grand Prix 2017 Opening Round Part 1 was a mixed martial arts event held by the Rizin Fighting Federation on July 30, 2017 at the Saitama Super Arena in Saitama, Japan.

Results

Rizin World Grand Prix 2017: Opening Round - Part 2

Rizin World Grand Prix 2017: Opening Round - Part 2 was a mixed martial arts event held by the Rizin Fighting Federation on October 15, 2017 at the Marine Messe Fukuoka in Fukuoka, Japan.

Background
Dan Henderson supposed to face fellow MMA legend Kazushi Sakuraba in a grappling match however, Henderson suffered a neck injury and Frank Shamrock step in as a replacement.

Kanna Asakura fought Saori Ishioka at DEEP JEWELS 17 in a Super Atomweight Grand Prix Qualification bout. Asakura won by Unanimous Decision.

Andy Nguyen missed weight.

Results

Rizin World Grand Prix 2017: 2nd Round

Rizin World Grand Prix 2017: 2nd Round was a mixed martial arts event held by the Rizin Fighting Federation on December 29, 2017 at the Saitama Super Arena in Saitama, Japan.

Background
Seiichiro Ito was to face Kai Asakura at this event but had to withdraw due to a nasal fractures. He was replaced by Kizaemon Saiga.

Gabrielle Garcia was scheduled to face Shinobu Kandori at this event. However, Garcia missed weight by over 26 pounds and the bout was canceled.

Results

Rizin Fan Expo 2017

Rizin Fan Expo 2017 was an Expo event held by the Rizin Fighting Federation on December 29-30-31,2017 at the Saitama Super Arena in Saitama, Japan.

Background
This expo featured the Rizin 2017 jiu-jitsu tournament, a Grappling tournament, a high school Sambo tournament, an amateur Kickboxing tournament and an amateur Mixed martial arts tournament.

Fight Card

Rizin World Grand Prix 2017: Final Round

Rizin World Grand Prix 2017: Final Round was a mixed martial arts event held by the Rizin Fighting Federation on December 31, 2017 at the Saitama Super Arena in Saitama, Japan.

Background
This event will hold the semi-finals and final of the Rizin Bantamweight Grand-Prix. The quarter-finals were held two days previous at Rizin World Grand Prix 2017: 2nd Round. Also on the card are the semi-finals and final of the Women's Super Atomweight Grand-Prix.

Results

References

External links
 http://www.rizinff.com/en/
 http://www.tapology.com/search?term=rizin&mainSearchFilter=events

Rizin Fighting Federation
2017 in mixed martial arts
2017 in Japanese sport